Baade is a surname of German origin. Notable people with the surname include:

Brunolf Baade (1904–1969), German aeronautical engineer
Carrie Ann Baade (born 1974), American painter
Else Baade (1911–1965), Danish swimmer 
Ernst-Günther Baade (1897–1945), German general
Knud Baade (1808–1879), Norwegian painter
Paul Baade (born 1940), American politician 
Paul W. Baade (1889–1959), American army officer 
Walter Baade (1893–1960), German astronomer

See also
Baade (disambiguation)
Baader, another German surname

German-language surnames